Painted Lips is a 1918 American silent drama film directed by Edward LeSaint and starring Louise Lovely, Alfred Allen and Lew Cody.

Cast
 Louise Lovely as Lou McTavish
 Alfred Allen as Capt. McTavish
 Lew Cody as Jim Douglass
 Hector Dion as Andrew Solman
 Beatrice Van as Mrs. Silver
 Betty Schade as Rose
 Mattie Witting as Mrs. Callahan

References

Bibliography
 Robert B. Connelly. The Silents: Silent Feature Films, 1910-36, Volume 40, Issue 2. December Press, 1998.

External links
 

1918 films
1918 drama films
1910s English-language films
American silent feature films
Silent American drama films
American black-and-white films
Universal Pictures films
Films directed by Edward LeSaint
1910s American films